John Foley may refer to:

Arts
 John Foley (author) (1917–1974), British soldier and author
 John Foley (Jesuit) (born 1939), American Jesuit priest and songwriter of Catholic liturgical music
 John Henry Foley (1818–1874), Irish sculptor
 John Miles Foley (1947–2012), folklorist

Military
 Sir John Foley (British Army officer) (born 1939), former Chief of Defence Intelligence and Lieutenant-Governor of Guernsey
 John D. Foley (1918–1999), American bomber gunner in World War II
 John H. Foley (1839–1874), American soldier and Medal of Honor recipient
 John Foley (major) (1813–1881), Irish-born soldier and merchant

Religion
 John Foley (Monsignor) (1854–1937), priest, educator and President of Carlow College
 John Patrick Foley (1935–2011), Roman Catholic cardinal
 John Samuel Foley (1833–1918), third Catholic bishop of Detroit, for whom Bishop Foley Catholic High School in Madison Heights, Michigan, is named

Sports
 John Foley (American football), former American college football linebacker
 John Foley (baseball) (1857–?), baseball player
 John Foley (rugby league), rugby league footballer of the 1900s, and 1910s for Wales, and Ebbw Vale
 John Foley (rugby union) (born 1997), Irish rugby union player

Other 

 John P. Foley (judge) (19381984), American lawyer and judge
 John R. Foley (19172001), U.S. congressman from Maryland
 John Foley (bushranger) (18331891), Australian convict
 John Foley (executive), American billionaire

See also
 Jack Foley (disambiguation)